The Plateau des Tourbières (in English the Plateau of Bogs) comprises the highest upland region of Amsterdam Island, a small French territory in the southern Indian Ocean.  Over 500 m above sea level, it contains the island's highest peaks: Mont de la Dives (881 m), Grande Marmite (742 m) and Mont Fernand (731 m).

Environment
The lower-lying areas of the island were mainly covered by a woodland of Phylica arborea trees mixed with ferns before the vegetation was devastated by a combination of wood-cutting, anthropogenic wildfire and grazing by feral cattle, and became replaced by exotic grassland.  The vegetation of the plateau, however, was not grazed by the cattle and remains in a largely natural state, consisting mainly of sphagnum bogs and mosses, with the dwarf shrub Acaena magellanica.

Important Bird Area
The plateau has been identified as an 800 ha Important Bird Area (IBA) by BirdLife International because it is the only breeding site in the world for the critically endangered Amsterdam albatross.  The species has a biennial breeding system with an average of 20 pairs breeding each year in a loose colony on the plateau.  The total population of the albatross is about 150 individuals.  The only other bird present is the brown skua, with some 40 breeding pairs.

References

Notes

Sources
 
 

Île Amsterdam
Mountains of France
Tourbieres
Landforms of the French Southern and Antarctic Lands
Important Bird Areas of Île Amsterdam
Seabird colonies